Esteban Martínez Navarro (born January 20, 1992) is a Spanish athlete (professional Mixed martial arts fighter), television personality, model, personal trainer, amateur rugby and American football player.

Career
Esteban Martínez Navarro is an athlete (professional Mixed martial arts fighter) and former TV personality from L'Eliana, Valencia. His mother is French, while his father is Spanish. In 2008, he took part to the Spanish pageant "Men's Health Spain - Concurso Nueva Cara". He has later appeared on the MTV reality show Gandía Shore, the Spanish adaptation of American show Jersey Shore, from its premiere on 4 October 2012 through its final episode on 3 February 2013.

He has been a contestant on Season 1 of Campamento de Verano, Spanish reality-show airing on Telecinco, gaining the fourth place.
He is one of the official protagonists of the Spanish reality show Super Shore aired on MTV Spain.

In February 2016, he modeled for the Mercedes-Benz Fashion Week Madrid show, on behalf of stylist Francis Montesinos.

Since 2018, he has competed as a Mixed martial arts fighter weighing 77 kg. (170 lbs.)

Reality shows

Personal life
He loves tattoos very much and he has many them covering his body, most of which are inked on his upper body.

References

1988 births
Living people
Spanish male models
People from Valencia